Luca Liverani (born 2 June 1989) is an Italian footballer who plays for  club Alessandria.

Club career
On 10 June 2017, he joined Monza.

On 11 July 2019, he signed a 2-year contract with Feralpisalò.

On 31 August 2022, Liverani joined Alessandria on a one-year contract.

References

External links
 
 

1989 births
Living people
Sportspeople from Ravenna
Italian footballers
Association football goalkeepers
Serie C players
Serie D players
U.S. Viterbese 1908 players
Celano F.C. Marsica players
A.S.D. Barletta 1922 players
Catania S.S.D. players
Paganese Calcio 1926 players
A.C. Monza players
FeralpiSalò players
U.S. Alessandria Calcio 1912 players
Footballers from Emilia-Romagna